The 1983 Northeast Louisiana Indians football team was an American football team that represented Northeast Louisiana University (now known as the University of Louisiana at Monroe) in the Southland Conference during the 1983 NCAA Division I-AA football season. In their third year under head coach Pat Collins, the team compiled a 8–3 record and as Southland Conference co-champions. The Indians offense scored 251 points while the defense allowed 119 points.

Schedule

References

Northeast Louisiana
Louisiana–Monroe Warhawks football seasons
Southland Conference football champion seasons
Northeast Louisiana Indians football